The Men's team sprint event of the 2008 UCI Track Cycling World Championships was held on 26 March 2008.

Results

Qualifying

Finals

References

Men's team sprint
UCI Track Cycling World Championships – Men's team sprint